West Coast Railways (WCR) is a railway spot-hire company and charter train operator based at Carnforth MPD in Lancashire. Using buildings and other facilities previously owned by the Steamtown Carnforth visitor attraction, in June 1998 the company became the first privately owned company to be given a licence as a train operating company.

History

Before 1998

After British Rail closed the Lakeside branch to passengers on 6 September 1965, a group of enthusiasts chaired by Dr Peter Beet formed the Lakeside Railway Estates Company, with the idea of preserving both the line and Carnforth MPD, to provide a complete steam operating system. After agreeing to rent out part of the Carnforth MPD site, but with the counter the development of the A590 road meaning that the complete vision was unsuccessful, Beet developed the visitor attraction Steamtown Carnforth, which became a mecca for steam enthusiasts from 1967.

In 1974, Sir Bill McAlpine became a shareholder in the company, with his 4472 Flying Scotsman making Carnforth its home. McAlpine subsequently acquired a controlling interest in the company, in order to fund the purchase of the complete site including the track from British Rail.

In light of McAlpine's declining interest, in 1990 his controlling interest in Steamtown Railway Museum was sold to David Smith, who over the following years has bought out most of the minority shareholders. With increasing Health & Safety Executive regulations, and an increased reliance on revenue from supplying and servicing steam locomotives to power enthusiast trains, the commercial decision was taken not to reopen Carnforth as a museum or visitor attraction for the 1998 season. Steamtown Railway Museum still exists today as the holding company, and operates an extensive railway repair and operating facility on the site.

After 1998
In June 1998, West Coast Railway Company was granted an operating licence to become a train operating company. WCR is a spot hire company which provides locomotives, stock and crews to other companies within the rail industry. The company operates charter trains, some of which are hauled by steam locomotives. The company provides stock and crews for steam workings on the national network, and for diesel tours. The headquarters, engineering base and depot are at Carnforth, where locomotives and stock are stored and maintained, and where contract work is undertaken for other operators.

WCR own and operated steam locomotive 5972 Olton Hall under the guise of Hogwarts Castle for the Harry Potter film series, with the Hogwarts Express.

March 2015 incident and operating licence suspension

The signal was being maintained at danger to ensure the safety of the FGW train after it had passed through the junction, as is signalling practice.

The incident was investigated by track owner Network Rail (NR), the Office of Rail Regulation and the Rail Accident Investigation Branch (RAIB). The RAIB launched an investigation into the incident on 27 March, releasing a statement in which they described the incident as a "dangerous occurrence". According to the RAIB, the incident was caused by driver error, after the traincrew isolated the Automatic Warning System and Train Protection & Warning System on approach to a temporary speed restriction in the area of line immediately after signal SN43, the signal before signal SN45. These were not reinstated on approach to signal SN45; as a result, the train was not automatically stopped by the safety systems as it passed the signal at danger.  down the line, the train was manually brought to a stop by the driver; it came to a rest across Wootton Bassett Junction.

WCR and NR met on 30 March 2015. NR subsequently expressed the view that at that meeting "WCR demonstrated that its controls, communication and commitment following the recent SPAD were inadequate" and that since then "the response by the senior management of WCR to the issues raised" had been "inadequate", suspending WCR's operator's licence effective from midnight 3 April 2015. Previously operators had been banned from certain routes, but this was a total network ban unprecedented since privatisation. The suspension notice states:

WCR stated that it was in negotiations with NR regarding the terms of the suspension, and also with other train operating companies in order to prevent the cancellation of many scheduled WCR operated railtours during the period of suspension.

On 8 May 2015, Network Rail lifted the track access ban off the company. This meant that the company could continue its scheduled tours for the coming months including the first of the Jacobite railtours.

On 9 December 2015, the Office of Rail & Road (ORR) announced that the WCR and the driver of the train involved in the incident at Wootton Bassett were to be prosecuted for offences contrary to the Health and Safety at Work Act 1974. An initial hearing was scheduled at Swindon Magistrates Court for 11 January 2016. The case came to trial at Swindon Crown Court on 27 June 2016. WCR and driver Melvyn Cox both pleaded guilty. WCR was fined £200,000 and £64,000 costs. Cox was given a four-month prison sentence, suspended for eighteen months. He was also ordered to do 80 hours unpaid work.

November 2015
On 24 November 2015 it was reported that the ORR had temporarily prohibited WCR from operating steam trains on the mainline rail network, following an initial investigation into an incident near Doncaster on 2 October 2015 when 45231 The Sherwood Forester was hauling a WCR 'Spirit of the Lakes' charter train and the footplate crew of the engine had isolated the Train Protection & Warning System equipment which would have applied the emergency brake if the driver made a safety critical error.

February 2016 Prohibition Notice
On 17 February 2016 the ORR issued a Prohibition Notice to WCR preventing it running its heritage rail services on the mainline railway. The notice related to concerns about WCR's management of safety, following a number of incidents over the past year.

Under the terms of the notice, the company was not able to operate trains on the mainline network until the ORR was satisfied its governance and operations meet industry practice. Steps the company were required to take included: the introduction of clearer governance structures with proper accountability for safety; more robust risk assessments; and enhanced processes for managing staff with a focus on safety culture. Ian Prosser, HM Chief Inspector of Railways at ORR, said the decision to revoke the company's safety certificate had "not been taken lightly".

On 23 March 2016 the track access ban was lifted.

On 25 September 2018, the ORR, after extensive review and consultation with other affected parties, renewed West Coast Railway safety certificate for a period of five years.

Services

WCR operates several regular steam-hauled excursions every summer. The most famous of these trains is The Jacobite (named for the historic Jacobite political movement). It runs along the West Highland Line from Fort William to Mallaig, crossing Glenfinnan Viaduct. It runs Monday to Fridays from the middle of May until the end of October and also runs at weekends from the end of June until the end of August. In 2011, WCR added a second Jacobite service, leaving Fort William in the afternoons from the start of June until the end of August running on Wednesdays, Thursdays and Fridays. 2012 saw this second service increase to five days a week, between June and August.

In July 2002, WCR began to operate the steam-hauled Scarborough Spa Express operated from York to Scarborough three times a week between July and September. After a steam ban on the eastern region in 2014 which resulted in the season being axed a restricted season ran for 2015 over three days in October. This was once again put into place for three days in October 2016; the tour was also renamed The Scarborough Flyer for the 2016 season.

In 2007, West Coast Railways took over operation of the Cambrian Coast Express running over the Cambrian Line from Machynlleth to Porthmadog and Pwllheli and renamed it The Cambrian. The service ran from the last week of July until the end of August between 2007 and 2010. Before the 2011 season, WCR issued a statement stating that due to Network Rail's implementation of the new European Train Control System (ETCS) signalling on the Cambrian Coast, which necessitated new in-cab signalling equipment, the seasonal steam services had to cease running because there isn't yet a system available for fitment in steam locomotives.

In 2014, The Dalesman was brought back after a few years absence. The tour started at York and travelled to Carlisle via Normanton, Wakefield, Leeds, Keighley, Skipton, Hellifield and the Settle & Carlisle line. The tour was diesel-hauled from York to Hellifield where steam traction took over the train and travelled along the Settle and Carlisle line to Carlisle and then back to Hellifield. It had been planned to run only on Thursdays for 2016 but due to a landslip north of Appleby on the Settle and Carlisle line, The Dalesman did not run again until 2017 when the line re-opened.

In 2016, to replace The Dalesman season, a new set of tours of The Scarborough Spa Express were run from Carnforth to Scarborough with steam haulage being between York and Scarborough. Alternating each week the tour would for one week run from Carnforth to York via Hellifield and Keighley and then the following week would run via Preston, Blackburn and Brighouse. As of 2020 these trips are still running in place of the original Scarborough Spa Express trains; the tours start off diesel worked from Carnforth with a steam loco taking over in York.

In June 2018, West Coast Railways ran a service on the Windermere branch line between Oxenholme and Windermere after Arriva Rail North cancelled all trains on the line in the short term in an attempt to fix the disruption and cancellations around their network.

Train Operating Company
WCR provides locomotives, stock and crews for railtour organisers. It provides crews to SRPS and Vintage Trains, who own their own stock. WCR act or have acted as train operating company to the following companies:
 Branch Line Society
 North-East Railtours (Part operated by SRPS Railtours)
 Pathfinder Tours
 Railway Touring Company
 Saltburn Railtours
 SRPS Railtours
 Spirit of the Lakes
 West Coast Railtours (Formerly Compass Tours)
 21st Century Steam Ltd (Formerly Tornado Railtours)(Operations shared with DB Cargo UK)

Former companies operated with:
 Vintage Trains (WCR unable to provide crews for tours from start of 2018, trains now operated by Vintage Trains CBS)
 The Royal Scotsman (Contracted ended April 2016 by owners due to running issues with WCR and awarded to GB Railfreight)
 Budgie Transport (Ceased railtour operations in 2011)
 Compass Tours (Ceased trading in 2014, company with similar name now operating)
 Daylight Railtours (Ceased trading in 2004)
 Nenta Traintours (No longer operated by WCR, now operated by DB Cargo UK)
 PMR Tours (Ceased trading in 2020)
 Railtourer (Ceased trading in 2013)
 Shepherd Neame (Ceased tour operations in 2013)
 Spitfire Railtours (Ceased trading in 2012)
 Statesman Rail (No longer operated by WCR, now operated by Locomotive Services)
 Steam Dreams (No longer operated by WCR, now operated by Locomotive Services)

Routes
Routes commonly operated over by WCR include the nearby Cumbrian Coast Line and Furness line, Little North Western Line, the Settle & Carlisle line and the West Highland Line.

Depots
The headquarters and main depot is at Carnforth MPD. The former LMS depot coded 10A has workshops for steam and diesel locomotives, and also carriage and wagon facilities to maintain the company's fleet of Mark 1 and Mark 2 carriages. The site includes extensive sidings plus a paint shop.

The company's second base is the former Great Western Railway depot at Southall Railway Centre in West London which it has occupied since 2008. "The Green Train" is based here, used on "The Cathedrals Express".

For half of the year the company also uses part of Fort William depot as a base for the stock and locomotives for its Jacobite service. The Transport for Wales depot at Machynlleth has also been used previously for the Cambrian trains, but due to the line having the new ETCS system fitted which presently isn't compatible with steam locos the services had to cease.

Rolling stock

The company owns and operates a fleet of diesel locomotives, which are primarily used to haul charter trains, but have also been hired to other railway operators. The fleet is mainly composed of Class 37 and Class 47 locomotives, but also includes Class 57 locomotives, including the prototype passenger locomotive 57601.

Several Class 37 locomotives were purchased from Ian Riley Engineering, which ceased its spot-hire operations in mid-2004. In 2005, WCR won the contract to haul The Royal Scotsman luxury train. As a result, its two operational Class 37 locomotives and a Class 47 were repainted into a revised maroon livery, officially known as Royal Scotsman Claret, based on that of the Royal Scotsman carriages. In late 2005, WCR sold its two operational Class 37 locomotives (nos. 37197 and 37261) to Direct Rail Services, and received four Class 33 locomotives in exchange. As of 2011, WCR started investing in more Class 57 locomotives, bought from Advenza Freight, Harry Needle Railroad Company, Freightliner and Porterbrook.

The company's coaching stock consists of vacuum and air plus dual braked Mark 1 and Mark 2 coaches, mostly painted in the British Railways maroon livery, albeit with West Coast Railways branding on the bodyside. Some of these coaches were built as British Railways Pullman coaches.

Fleet details

Steam locomotives
Locomotives listed here are not owned by WCR, but are made available to operate on the mainline by their respective owners (assuming they have the appropriate mainline certification).

Some engines may not now be operated on the mainline because their mainline or boiler ticket has expired or may be on display away from the national network. 5972 Olton Hall was on a 2-year loan agreement from November 2014 to the Warner Bros Studio Tour in Leavesden for their Harry Potter tour.

Modern Traction
All locomotives below are owned and operated by West Coast Railways.

Diesel locomotives
Note: Marked names indicate that the loco is not presently wearing them.

Shunting Engines

Mainline Diesels

Donor Locos 
Under Construction

Preserved locomotives
Bold = Current number

See also
 Accidents and incidents involving West Coast Railways

References

Sources

External links

Official site

Companies based in Lancashire
Post-privatisation British railway companies
Railway companies established in 1998
1998 establishments in England